European Youth Olympic Festival (also European Youth Olympic Days) is a multi-sport event held in both summer and winter disciplines every second year. Figure skating is one of the sports in its winter edition. The competition is held in junior category.

Medalists

Men

Ladies

Pairs

Ice dancing

Cumulative medal count

References

External links
 

 
European Youth Olympic Festival
European Youth Olympics
European Youth Olympic Winter Festival